Baltimore City Council's 1st District is a council district located in Southeast Baltimore, Maryland.

About the district
District 1 includes the neighborhoods of Bayiew, Brewer's Hill, Broening Manor, Butchers Hill, Canton, Douglass Place, Eastwood, Fells Point, Graceland Park Greektown, Harbor East, Harbor Point, Highlandtown, Little Italy, Medford, O'Donnell Heights, Patterson Park, Saint Helena and Upper Fells Point. The current first district City Councilman is Zeke Cohen.

2020 Primary election 
On June 3, 2020, the City Board of Elections reported that most mail-in style ballots were unable to be counted, due to a typo by the supplier, SeaChange.

Electoral results

In popular culture 

 In television series The Wire, it is represented by Tommy Carcetti.

See also
Baltimore City Council

References

External links

District 1
Southeast Baltimore